Scandal at the Girls' School is a 1953 West German comedy film directed by Erich Kobler and starring Walter Giller, Günther Lüders and Joachim Brennecke.

It was made at the Bavaria Studios in Munich. The film's sets were designed by the art directors Ernst H. Albrecht and Arne Flekstad.

Synopsis
Some men have to dress up in drag in order to hide away in a female boarding school.

Cast
 Walter Giller as Paul Heller
 Günther Lüders as Josef Freudinger
 Joachim Brennecke as Ferdinand Dorn
 Marianne Koch as Marina von Leithen
 Erika von Thellmann as Pensionats-Direktorion
 Fritz Odemar as Fürst Maximilian
 Ernst Waldow as Oberst von Leithen
 Karin Andersen as Gerda
 Marianne Wischmann as Rita
 Adolf Gondrell as Obergardist Lukasch
 Petra Unkel as Mariechen Dorn
 Viktor Afritsch as Sekretär Stieglitz
 Helmuth M. Backhaus as Kommentator
 Käthe Itter as Frl. Schön
 Harry Hertzsch as Wirt
 Paula Braend as Anna Freudinger
 Sibylle von Gymnich
 Lilli Uhde
 Adalbert von Cortens
 Dietrich Thoms
 Wolf Harro
 Gitta Lind as Chansonette
 Georg von Block

References

Bibliography 
 Bock, Hans-Michael & Bergfelder, Tim. The Concise Cinegraph: Encyclopaedia of German Cinema. Berghahn Books, 2009.

External links 
 

1953 films
1953 comedy films
German comedy films
West German films
1950s German-language films
Films directed by Erich Kobler
Cross-dressing in film
Films set in Europe
German black-and-white films
1950s German films
Films shot at Bavaria Studios